Nikolai Nikolayevich Kovardaev (born 24 September 1970) is a Russian professional football coach and a former player. He is the manager of FC Torpedo-2 Moscow.

Club career
He made his professional debut in the Soviet Second League in 1987 for SK EShVSM Moscow. He played 1 game in the UEFA Cup 1992–93 for FC Dynamo Moscow. He also played for FC Lokomotiv Moscow in 1988 in USSR Federation Cup.

Coaching career
On 18 August 2022, Kovardaev was appointed as an assistant manager of the Russian Premier League club FC Torpedo Moscow.

Honours
 Russian Premier League bronze: 1992, 1993.

References

1970 births
People from Volokolamsky District
Living people
Soviet footballers
Russian footballers
FC Lokomotiv Moscow players
FC Dynamo Moscow players
Russian Premier League players
FC Tyumen players
FC Elista players
FC Shinnik Yaroslavl players
FC Khimki players
Russian football managers
Russian Premier League managers
Association football forwards
FC FShM Torpedo Moscow players
Sportspeople from Moscow Oblast